Oran is a town and a nagar panchayat in Banda district in the Indian state of Uttar Pradesh.

Geography
It has an average elevation of 118 metres (387 feet).

Demographics
As of the 2001 Census of India, Oran had a population of 6,189. Males constitute 55% of the population and females 45%. Oran has an average literacy rate of 46%, lower than the national average of 59.5%: male literacy is 59%, and female literacy is 30%. In Oran, 19% of the population is under 6 years of age.

References

Cities and towns in Banda district, India